Camille Gérondeau (born 12 March 1988) is a French professional rugby union player. He plays at flanker for Clermont in the Top 14 since 2015. He was born in Caudéran in Bordeaux.

References

External links
Ligue Nationale De Rugby Profile
European Professional Club Rugby Profile
Racing Metro Profile
Gerondeau joins Clermont

French rugby union players
1988 births
Living people
Rugby union flankers
Rugby union number eights
Racing 92 players
ASM Clermont Auvergne players
Castres Olympique players
Sportspeople from Bordeaux
AS Béziers Hérault players
Union Bordeaux Bègles players
SU Agen Lot-et-Garonne players